Lagarde is a commune in the Ariège department in southwestern France.

History
On 25 May 1969, the commune of Lagarde was struck by an F3 tornado. It destroyed nearby hamlets and transportation in the village and the surrounding area. A few hours later in the department of Aude the tornado devastated the village of Leuc. Such a wave of powerful tornadoes is rare in France.

Sights

Chateau
The Château de Lagarde is an imposing medieval building constructed in the 11th century with the first square tower (1063–1065) by Ramiro I, King of Aragon and Count of Barcelona. Between the 1176 and 1180 the chateau developed with 4 square towers and with a rectangular entry with a door made out of wood, a drawbridge and ditch at the foot of the walls.

In the middle of the beautiful paved yard is a well which is 62 meters depth and 2 meters in diameter cut with stone 1.20 metres thick. Simon de Montfort, 5th Earl of Leicester allotted the village of Lagarde and its castle to Guy I of Lévis, lieutenant of his army, in 1212. This was conducted after Simon de Montfort convened at Pamiers in a general meeting of nobles, prelates and noted middle-class men, where they drew up a 46 article administration doctrine of the place. It was ratified by the Treaty of Paris and signed on 12 April 1229 on the square of Notre-Dame.

Population

See also
Communes of the Ariège department

References

Communes of Ariège (department)
Ariège communes articles needing translation from French Wikipedia